The 2015–16 season was Shrewsbury Town's 130th year in existence and their first season back in League One after gaining promotion the previous season. Much of the season was spent fighting relegation, with safety only secured following the final home match of the season where despite losing to Peterborough United, same day defeats for Blackpool and Doncaster Rovers ensured another season of League One football with one game to spare.

The club also participated in the FA Cup, notably reaching the fifth round for the first time since 1991, and also reached the second rounds of both the League Cup and the Football League Trophy. A team consisting of fringe and youth players retained the Shropshire Senior Cup for the second consecutive season after beating AFC Telford United on penalties in the final.

The season covers the period from 1 July 2015 to 30 June 2016.

Players

First team squad information
As of match played 8 May 2016.

Transfers

Transfers in

Transfers out

Loans in

Loans out

New contracts & contract extensions

Competitions

Pre-season friendlies

League One

League table

Matches

League Cup
On 16 June 2015, the first round draw was made, Shrewsbury Town were drawn away against Blackburn Rovers. In the second round, Shrewsbury Town were drawn against Crystal Palace away.

FA Cup
The draw for the first-round was made on 26 October 2015. Shrewsbury travelled to Gainsborough Trinity.

The ties for the second-round were drawn on 9 November. Shrewsbury were drawn away to Grimsby Town. The draw for the third-round took place on 7 December, before the fixture at Blundell Park was played. Shrewsbury required a replay to secure a tie away at Cardiff City.

The draw for the fourth-round was made on 11 January 2016. Shrewsbury were drawn at home to Sheffield Wednesday.

The draw for the fifth round was made on 31 January 2016. Manchester United were drawn to visit New Meadow.

Football League Trophy
On 8 August 2015, live on Soccer AM the draw for the first round of the Football League Trophy was drawn by Toni Duggan and Alex Scott. Shrewsbury will host Oldham Athletic. Ties for the second round were drawn on 5 September, Shrewsbury travelled to Fleetwood Town.

Shropshire Senior Cup
On 22 June 2015, Shrewsbury Town confirmed that their first-team squad would play Market Drayton Town in the semi-final of the Shropshire Senior Cup. AFC Telford United travelled to New Meadow for the final.

Player statistics

Squad stats
As of match played 8 May 2016.

|-
|-
|colspan="14"|Players away from the club on loan:
|-

|-
|-
|colspan="14"|Players who left the club before the season ended:
|-

|}

Top scorers
As of match played 8 May 2016.

Players in italics left the club before the season ended

Disciplinary record
As of match played 8 May 2016.

Players in italics left the club before the season ended

References

Shrewsbury Town
Shrewsbury Town F.C. seasons